= Poyanar =

Village in Maharashtra

- Village
- Interactive map of Poyanar
- Country: India
- State: Maharashtra

Poyanar is a small village in Ratnagiri district, Maharashtra state in Western India. The 2011 Census of India recorded a total of 1,068 residents in the village. Poyanar's geographical area is approximately 978 hectares (2,420 acres).

Poyanar Kh. is a small village in the same region. The 2011 Census of India recorded a total of 109 residents in the village. Poyanar's geographical area is approximately 78 hectares (190 acres).
